Franco Orgera (13 January 1908 – date of death unknown) was an Italian modern pentathlete. He competed at the 1936 Summer Olympics, finishing 22nd in the individual event. His best performance was in the discipline of Fencing, where he finished 8th with 23.5 points.

Along with his team-mates, Silvano Abbà and Ugo Ceccarelli, Orgera joined the fascist volunteer corps (Freiwilligenkorps) and took part in the Spanish Civil War.  He became a lieutenant in the Frecce Nere ("Black Arrows") brigade, and wrote lyrics for the brigade song "Inno della Brigata" to the tune of the fascist marching song "Faccetta Nera" by Mario Ruccione.

References

External links
 

1908 births
Year of death missing
Italian male modern pentathletes
Olympic modern pentathletes of Italy
Modern pentathletes at the 1936 Summer Olympics
20th-century Italian people